IIIT is an initialism that may refer to:

 Indian Institutes of Information Technology, a group of institutes of higher education in India
 Indraprastha Institute of Information Technology, Delhi, an autonomous university in Delhi, India
 International Institutes of Information Technology (disambiguation), one of several higher-education institutes in India
 International Institute of Islamic Thought, an American non-profit organization